Southern Yankee may refer to:

A Southern Yankee, a 1948 film
Southern Unionist, someone from the American South who opposed secession